A rondel dagger  or roundel dagger was a type of stiff-bladed dagger in Europe in the late Middle Ages (from the 14th century onwards), used by a variety of people from merchants to knights.  It was worn at the waist and might be used as a utility tool, or worn into battle or in a jousting tournament as a side arm.

Design and construction

The blade was made of steel, and was typically long and slim with a tapering needle point, measuring 12 inches (30 cm) or more; the whole dagger might be as long as 20 inches (50 cm).  Rondel means round or circular; the dagger gets its name from its round (or similarly shaped, e.g. octagonal) hand guard and round or spherical pommel (knob on the end of the grip).

The blade's tang extended through the handle, which was cylindrical, normally carved from wood or bone.  In cross section, the blade was usually diamond-shaped, lenticular, or triangular. These blades would have a sharpened point, and either one or both edges would also be sharpened. They were principally designed for use with a stabbing action, either underarm, or over arm with a reverse grip (reminiscent of an ice pick). The long straight blade would not have lent itself to a slashing or sabre action.  

Rondel daggers were designed to be ideal for close-quarter combat which often required grappling. They were used for puncturing and bursting the links in mail armour and they could penetrate the weaker points in plate armour and helmets, such as areas of thinner plate, any gaps and the various joints. As armour improved, puncturing in such ways was one of the only ways in which the heavy armour of men-at-arms could be breached.

Examples also exist of four-edged rondel daggers, the blade having a cruciform profile.  These blades would not have been suited for cutting, or use as a general utility tool; they would have been worn as a side-arm in battle as a thrusting weapon, foreshadowing the appearance of the stiletto in the 16th century.  Rondel daggers which have survived and found their way into museums and collections are usually those with fine craftsmanship and often ornate decoration.  The blades may be engraved, the grips ornately carved, and the hand guards and pommels highly decorated.

Use
The rondel dagger evolved in the 14th century from the early knightly dagger of the 12th to 13th centuries, matching the evolution of full plate armour.
By the 15th century it had become the standard side-arm for knights, and would have been carried into battles such as the Battle of Agincourt in 1415. The contemporary post-mortem on the remains of King Richard III show that at the Battle of Bosworth in 1485 he suffered a rondel wound to the head before other fatal wounds.  They were a knight's backup weapon to be used in hand-to-hand fighting, and as such one of their last lines of defense.  Since they were able to penetrate a suit of armour (at the joints, or through the visor of the helmet), rondel daggers could be used to force an unseated or wounded knight to surrender, for a knight might fetch a good ransom if taken alive.

In the 15th century, the rondel dagger also rose to popularity among the emerging middle class. In a scene from a miniature by Girart de Roussillon depicting the construction of twelve churches in France (c. 1448), merchants and tradesmen can be seen wearing rondel daggers at their waists.

Hans Talhoffer in his combat manuals of the 1440s to 1460s includes numerous examples of techniques for fighting with the rondel dagger, both in unarmoured combat and in single combat in armour.

See also
 List of daggers
 List of medieval weapons
 Military technology and equipment

References

External links

 Spotlight: The Rondel Dagger (myArmoury.com article)
 Website about Talhoffers Fetchbuch
 Overview of Medieval arms and armour Montanaro's Medieval Period
 Overview of the 15th century knight's weapons and armor 

Daggers
Medieval blade weapons